Suzanne Winona Zimmerman (July 13, 1925 – March 14, 2021), also known by her married name Suzanne Edwards, was an American competition swimmer and Olympic medalist.  At the 1948 Summer Olympics in London, Zimmerman won a silver medal in the 100-meter backstroke.

Zimmerman was born in Portland, Oregon.  Growing up in Oregon, her swim coach was International Swimming Hall of Fame member Jack Cody.  Along with fellow 1948 Olympians Brenda Helser and Nancy Merki, Zimmerman was part of the Multnomah Athletic Club team dubbed "Cody's Kids" that from 1939 to 1948, won 58 individual national swimming titles and three national team swimming championships. She is a member of the Oregon Sports Hall of Fame.

See also
 List of Olympic medalists in swimming (women)

References

1925 births
2021 deaths
American female backstroke swimmers
Olympic silver medalists for the United States in swimming
Swimmers from Portland, Oregon
Swimmers at the 1948 Summer Olympics
Medalists at the 1948 Summer Olympics
21st-century American women